Sultan Guled Abdi was a Somali ruler. He was the first Sultan of the Isaaq Sultanate and his numerous offspring would form the Rer Guled and continue to lead after his death.

Biography
The Isaaq Sultanate was established in the mid-18th century by Sultan Guled of the Eidagale clan. His coronation took place after the victorious battle of Lafaruug in which his father the legendary Abdi Eisa successfully lead the Isaaq in battle and defeated the Absame tribes, permanently pushing them out of present-day Maroodi Jeex region. After witnessing his leadership skills, noble conduct and valiance, the Isaaq chiefs recognized his father Abdi who refused to adopt the Sultan title preferring his son. Guled would be crowned the first Grand Sultan of the Isaaq clan. Sultan Guled ruled the Isaaq from the 1750s up until his death in the early 19th century, where he was succeeded by his eldest son Farah.

See also
Garhajis
Habr Je'lo
Habr Awal
Arap
Isaaq

References

Somali sultans
18th-century Somalian people
19th-century Somalian people
Somalian Muslims
Year of birth missing
Grand Sultans of the Isaaq Sultanate